Chong Shing Yit Pao (also known as Chong Shing Yat Pao and Restoration Daily), was a Chinese-language newspaper in Singapore. The newspaper was founded in 1907 by Tongmenghui members in response to the growing influence of The Union Times, a paper which they had founded but had fallen under the control of reformists.

History
The first edition of the newspaper was published on 27 August.

The paper's literary section was used to argue, slander and refute the reformists and The Union Times through short stories, poetry and humour. Both papers frequently used the literary section to insult the other side, using various insults such as "fleas", "mad dogs" and "prostitutes". Both papers occasionally sued each other for libel.

The paper folded in 1910 due to financial difficulties.

References

Chinese-language newspapers
Defunct newspapers published in Singapore
Newspapers published in Singapore
Publications established in 1907
Publications disestablished in 1910